Heike Friedrich (born 22 August 1966) is a former synchronized swimmer from Germany. She competed for West Germany in both the women's solo and women's duet competitions at the 1988 Summer Olympics.

References

External links 
 

1966 births
Living people
German synchronized swimmers
Olympic synchronized swimmers of West Germany
Synchronized swimmers at the 1988 Summer Olympics
Swimmers from Berlin